Frene Creek is a stream in northeast Gasconade County in the U.S. state of Missouri. It is a tributary of the Missouri River.

The stream flows northwest then turns northeast and flows roughly parallel to Missouri Route 100.

Frene Creek was named for the ash tree, "frêne" being a word derived from the French meaning "ash". The stream has also been called Ash Creek.

See also
List of rivers of Missouri

References

Rivers of Gasconade County, Missouri
Rivers of Missouri